Leo Allan Sjogren (April 3, 1914 – February 21, 1997) was an American racewalker. He competed in the men's 50 kilometres walk at the 1952 Summer Olympics and the 1956 Summer Olympics.

References

1914 births
1997 deaths
Athletes (track and field) at the 1952 Summer Olympics
Athletes (track and field) at the 1956 Summer Olympics
American male racewalkers
Olympic track and field athletes of the United States
Place of birth missing